Joenette Giselle Ife Salandy ORTT (25 January 1987 – 4 January 2009) was a Trinidadian professional boxer. She was an undefeated unified light middleweight world champion, holding the WBA and WBC, as well as the IWBF, WIBA, WIBF, and GBU female titles, from 2006 until her death in 2009.

Early life and education
Joenette Giselle Ife Salandy was born on 25 January 1987 in Siparia in southern Trinidad. Her mother Maureen died when Giselle was 11 years old. She then resided with Ivy Corian who raised her until she was 14 years old. She attended St. Bridgid's Girls' RC School, Penal Junior Secondary School and then Fyzabad Composite School. She had two siblings, Josanne and Joel.

Athletic career
At the age of eleven years, nursing a broken arm, Giselle visited the White Eagles Gym with her stepbrother Joel Eligon and started punching a punching bag. She was immediately recognized by the trainers in the gym, Kim 'Bone Crusher' Quashie and Fitzroy Richards. Giselle thereafter got involved in the sport. She made her professional debut at 13 years of age, under coach/manager, Fitzroy Richards. She picked up a series of six victory fights throughout Trinidad and Tobago and the islands of Tortola and Anguilla, with opponents such as Johanna Peña-Álvarez and Ria Ramnarine.

In October 2001, Salandy fought and defeated Paola Rojas, becoming the youngest person to win a boxing title, WIBA IBERO Title, at age 14.

After six fights under coach/manager, Fitzroy Richards, Salandy changed manager to her adopted father, Curtis Joseph and trainer to Joseph "Black Mamba" Charles, a former boxer.  Thereafter she could not have boxed because the law of Trinidad and Tobago stated a person under the age of 17 cannot obtain a professional boxing license, thus causing her boxing career to come to a temporary halt.

Five days after her 17th birthday, Giselle returned to the ring in Chaguanas and successfully defended her IBERO Title against Paola Rojas on a card co-promoted by Curtis Joseph, Boxu Potts and Cecil Ford. After that fight her manager, Curtis Joseph, failed to secure fights for her causing her boxing career to come to a halt again. Boxu Potts privately contacted her about a show he was promoting. Salandy then pressured Curtis Joseph into allowing her to represent her country by fighting on Potts' T&T vs. US boxing card.

At age 18, on 23 September 2005, on the T&T vs. US boxing card, promoted by Boxu Potts, Salandy fought and defeated Manela Daniels, breaking a second world record by becoming the youngest female in the world to win the NABC World Title. However, again, manager Curtis Joseph was unable to secure fights for her. She became frustrated with this and severed her work relationship with Curtis Joseph. Shortly after, Salandy and Kim Quashie contacted Boxu Potts to take over managing her career.

Salandy fought Manela Daniels at the Petrotrin Grounds in Fyzabad, a fight she had previously booked, which was promoted by Arthur Sanderson. Salandy then signed a promotional contract with Potts and left her Fyzabad home and went to live with Potts and his family at their Arima home while Miller was in training camp in Ghana.

On 9 December 2006 she became the first person to win six world title belts in one fight. Salandy was awarded Top History Making Fighter of the year 2006 by WBAN, was awarded First Citizen Sports Woman of the year 2006 by The First Citizen Sports Foundation in Trinidad and Tobago and was also presented with the Chaconia Gold Medal by the President of Trinidad and Tobago for her achievement in boxing. This is the second highest national award in Trinidad and Tobago.

Salandy successfully defended her six world titles against Yvonne Reis on 24 March 2007.

On 15 March 2008 super middleweight Natascha Ragosina broke Salandy's record by winning seven belts in one fight. However, only two weeks later at the Centre of Excellence in Trinidad and Tobago, Salandy fought and defeated the then unbeaten Karolina Lukasik in her mandatory defense, regaining her world record by winning eight title belts in one fight.  These title belts were: WBC, WBA, WBE, WIBA, IWBF, WIBF, GBU and UBC.

Again on 26 December 2008, Salandy fought and defeated the fourth ranked Yahaira Hernandez, securing her eight title belts and breaking a Caribbean record by being the first boxer in the history of the Caribbean to successfully defend all her world titles six consecutive times.

On 31 August 2009 Salandy was posthumously awarded Trinidad's highest national award, the Order of the Republic of Trinidad and Tobago.  Salandy was the first boxer in the history of the Caribbean to ever receive such an award.

She was inducted into the International Women's Boxing Hall of Fame in July 2016

Death
Salandy died in a motor vehicle collision on the morning of 4 January 2009, crashing her vehicle into a concrete pillar while driving west into Port of Spain on the Beetham Highway. She succumbed to her injuries at around 8:29 a.m. She was 21 years old. The other occupant of the vehicle, national footballer Tamar Watson, was admitted to hospital in critical condition, having suffered massive internal injuries and broken limbs.

Salandy was given a state funeral.

Controversy
Relatives of Salandy questioned why she was allowed to drive herself on Sunday, as she had a driver was assigned to her. Salandy, who held a driver's permit for the last two years, hired a 21-year-old man to be her driver because of her hectic schedule. Boxu Potts dispelled rumours that the driver abandoned his job, and claimed it was Salandy's decision to drive herself, and her cousin stressed that no one was to blame for the accident.

Professional boxing record

References

External links

"Giselle Salandy is laid to rest | Video courtesy C News."
"Giselle Salandy dies tragically in a car accident."
"World Boxing Champion Giselle Salandy Dies"
"WBAN Biographies"
"Do you know Giselle Salandy?"
"T&T's undefeated world class female boxer Giselle Salandy dead in vehicular accident"

|-

|-

|-

|-

1987 births
2009 deaths
Road incident deaths in Trinidad and Tobago
Trinidad and Tobago women boxers
Light-middleweight boxers
People from Siparia region